Kristýna Pálešová (born 22 February 1991 in Ivančice) is a Czech former artistic gymnast and part of the national team.

She participated at the 2008 Summer Olympics and 2012 Summer Olympics in London, United Kingdom, and the 2011 World Artistic Gymnastics Championships.

Pálešová made her international debut in 2007, at the European Championships, having taken up the sport at the age of 5. She retired in 2016.

References

External links
http://www.intlgymnast.com/index.php?option=com_content&view=article&id=3125:ig-online-interview-kristyna-palesova-cze&catid=3:interviews&Itemid=56
http://www.intlgymnast.com/index.php?option=com_content&view=article&id=3591:paleova-presses-past-injury-toward-europeans&catid=2:news&Itemid=166
http://www.gettyimages.co.uk/photos/krist%C3%BDna-p%C3%A1le%C5%A1ov%C3%A1?excludenudity=true&sort=mostpopular&mediatype=photography&phrase=krist%C3%BDna%20p%C3%A1le%C5%A1ov%C3%A1

1991 births
Living people
Czech female artistic gymnasts
Gymnasts at the 2012 Summer Olympics
Olympic gymnasts of the Czech Republic
Gymnasts at the 2008 Summer Olympics
People from Ivančice
Sportspeople from the South Moravian Region